Kristin Ross (born 1953) is a professor emeritus of comparative literature at New York University. She is primarily known for her work on French literature and culture of the 19th, 20th, and 21st centuries.

Life and work
Ross received her Ph.D. from Yale University in 1981 and since then has written a number of books, including The Emergence of Social Space: Rimbaud and the Paris Commune (1988), Fast Cars, Clean Bodies: Decolonization and the Reordering of French Culture (1995) and May '68 and its Afterlives (2002).  She edited Anti-Americanism (2004) with Andrew Ross (no relation). In 2015, her book Communal Luxury: The Political Imaginary of the Paris Commune appeared.

For Fast Cars, Clean Bodies, Ross was awarded a Critic's Choice Award and the Lawrence Wylie Award for French Cultural Studies. Professor Ross has also received a Guggenheim Fellowship and a fellowship from the Institute for Advanced Study in Princeton, New Jersey.

Ross has also translated several works from French including Jacques Ranciere's The Ignorant Schoolmaster. Along with her research interests in French political culture and literature, Ross's work gains its focus through her interest in urban and revolutionary history, theory, politics, ideology and popular culture.

Selected bibliography

(co-editor, with Alice Kaplan). Everyday Life, co-ed., Yale French Studies, no. 73. Fall 1987. 
The Emergence of Social Space: Rimbaud and the Paris Commune. University of Minnesota Press. 1988. 
French translation, Les Prairies Ordinaires, 2012.
Fast Cars, Clean Bodies: Decolonization and the Reordering of French Culture. MIT Press. 1995. 
French translation, re-edition, Flammarion, 2006.
May '68 and Its Afterlives. Chicago. 2002. 
French translation, Le Monde Diplomatique/Complexe, 2005. Re-edition Editions Agone 2011.
(co-editor, with Andrew Ross). Anti-Americanism. NYU Press, 2004. 
(contributor) Democracy in What State?. Columbia University Press, 2011. 
Communal Luxury: The Political Imaginary of the Paris Commune. Verso, 2015. 
French edition, La Fabrique, 2015.
(translator and preface). 'The Zad and NoTav:  Territorial Struggles and the Making of a New Political Intelligence.' (Verso 2018). Translation of the Mauvaise Troupe's 'Contrées.'

References

External links
By Kristin Ross
"Henri Lefebvre on the Situationist International" Interview conducted and translated 1983 by Kristin Ross, in October (journal) 79 (Winter 1997)
"Closing Time" Obituary of Norman Brown in Radical Philosophy, 118 (Mar/Apr 2003).
"Q&A: Visiting Distinguished Professor in Humanities Kristin Ross discusses detective novels, feminism and the French response to Iraq" - Interview with Kristin Ross at Grinnell College (September 10, 2004) 
"Ethics and the Rearmament of Imperialism Article to be published in a forthcoming book, (2005).
"Managing the Present" Commentary on the 40th anniversary of May 68 in France in Radical Philosophy, No. 149 (March/April 2008).

About Kristin Ross
"Red and black" A review of May '68 and its Afterlives in Radical Philosophy, (May/June 2003).
"Sam's Club" A review of a book edited by Kristin Ross, Anti-Americanism, in BOOKFORUM, (dec/jan 2005)

1953 births
Living people
New York University faculty
American literary critics
Women literary critics
Historians of France
Urban theorists
French–English translators
American women critics